The Renewable Energy Institute is the global professional and educational body for the renewable energy and low carbon sectors. Its focus is education and professional membership for those working and upskilling to work in renewable energy, energy storage, energy efficiency, energy conservation, hydrogen energy, electric vehicles. The Renewable Energy Institute is the first  Renewable Energy Institute in the Western Hemisphere. The Renewable Energy Institute, in cooperation with the affiliated European Energy Centre, European Centre of Technology and Centro Studi Galileo, runs a biennial European Conference on renewable energy, heating and cooling applications.  The institute was founded to assist with renewable energy education, training and conferences and to help develop a workforce capable of designing, installing, repairing and maintaining renewable energy equipment and managing renewable energy projects.

The Renewable Energy Institute, European Energy Centre, European Centre of Technology and Centro Studi Galileo work with the United Nations Environment Programme (UNEP) the Intergovernmental International Institute of Refrigeration  and Centro Studi Galileo, along with Universities such as Edinburgh Napier University and Heriot-Watt University in promoting the use of renewable energy technologies across the United Kingdom.

The Renewable Energy Institute is also active European-wide with workshops and conferences in renewable energy, Heating and Cooling technologies, see the 14th European Conference at Heriot-Watt University, Edinburgh.

The training activities of the institute, the European Centre of Technology, and its parent company Centro Studi Galileo are promoted through international and global partners.

The Renewable Energy Institute won the 2020 award issued by the Energy Institute

Activities of the Institute

European conferences organised with the UN (UNEP) on the latest technologies in renewable energy
Publications with the United Nations Environment Programme
Promotion of best practices in renewable energy through training technicians and personnel
Launching the Green New Deal in Europe, the United States of America and India

References

Energy in Europe
Organisations based in Edinburgh
Organizations established in 1975